INPADOC, which stands for International Patent Documentation, is an international patent collection. The database is produced and maintained by the European Patent Office (EPO). It contains patent families and legal status information, and is updated weekly.

INPADOC was founded by the World Intellectual Property Organization (WIPO) and the government of Austria under an agreement on May 2, 1972. A little less than twenty years later, in 1991, it was integrated into the European Patent Office. An EPO sub-office was then created in Vienna, Austria.

The INPADOC database, which is publicly accessible, provides information about patent families, i.e. corresponding patent applications, i.e., patent applications in different countries which claim the same priority and which normally disclose the same invention.  It also provides information concerning the legal status of patent applications and patents in those countries which report status changes.

See also 
 Espacenet
 International Patent Classification
 Patent classification
 Derwent World Patents Index
 FIZ Karlsruhe

Notes

References

External links 
 INPADOC page on the EPO web site
 INPADOCDB on STN

Patent search services